Manfred Letzerich (born 15 August 1942) is a German long-distance runner. He competed in the men's 5000 metres at the 1964 Summer Olympics.

References

1942 births
Living people
Athletes (track and field) at the 1964 Summer Olympics
Athletes (track and field) at the 1968 Summer Olympics
Athletes (track and field) at the 1972 Summer Olympics
German male long-distance runners
Olympic athletes of the United Team of Germany
Olympic athletes of West Germany
Place of birth missing (living people)
20th-century German people
21st-century German people